Route 341 is a collector road in the Canadian province of Nova Scotia.

It is located in Kings County and connects Kentville at Trunk 1 with Canard at Route 358.

The intersection of Route 341 with Route 358 is nicknamed "Jawbone Corner" by local residents.

Communities
Kentville
Canard

History
The entirety of Collector Highway 341 was designated as part of the Trunk Highway 41.

See also
List of Nova Scotia provincial highways

References

Nova Scotia provincial highways
Roads in Kings County, Nova Scotia